Zhuk (Cyrillic: Жук), Žuk, or Żuk (Polish), means beetle in Slavic languages. It may refer to:
Zhuk (surname)
Zhuk class patrol boat, Soviet and Russian patrol boat manufactured from 1970 to 1996
Zhuk radar, family of Russian airborne radars developed by NIIR Phazotron for multi-role combat aircraft such as the MiG-29 and the Su-27
FSC Żuk, a van and light truck produced in Lublin, Poland
Żuk Nowy, a village in Poland
Żuk Stary, a village in Poland
BŻ-4 Żuk, a Polish helicopter

See also
 
Zuk (disambiguation)